Flatbush General Hospital was a private "operated for profit" hospital

When the 719 Linden Boulevard (corner East 49th Street) facility closed, their medical records were transferred to Mount Sinai Brooklyn, a nearby hospital.

References

Notes

  

Defunct hospitals in Brooklyn